Many massacres were committed during the Algerian Civil War that began in 1991. The Armed Islamic Group (GIA) claimed responsibility for many of them, while for others no group has claimed responsibility. In addition to generating a widespread sense of fear, the massacres effected migration from and depopulation of the worst-affected areas. The number of massacres peaked in 1997, with a smaller peak in 1994, and they were particularly concentrated in the areas between Algiers and Oran, with very few occurring in the east or in the Sahara.

This list is not exhaustive and covers only events in which over 50 civilians or prisoners were killed; with the number of smaller massacres being far more numerous. Sources frequently disagree on the number of deaths.

Wilaya of Algiers
 Serkadji prison mutiny of 21 February 1995, 109 deaths
 Beni-Messous massacre of 5–6 September 1997, 87-151 deaths
 Bentalha massacre of 22 September 1997, 202-300 deaths

Wilaya of Ain-Defla
 Ain-Defla massacre of March 1994, 80 deaths
 Oued El-Had and Mezouara massacre of 3 August 1997, 76 deaths

Wilaya of Batna
 Batna-Msila Road massacre of 17 August 1996, 63 deaths

Wilayas of Bouira and Blida
 Blida massacre of March 1994, 82 deaths
 Haouch Khemisti massacre of 21 April 1997, 93-113 deaths
 Si-Zerrouk massacre of 27 July 1997, 51 deaths
 Souhane massacre of 20–21 August 1997, 63 deaths
 Beni-Ali massacre of 26 August 1997, 64 deaths
 Rais massacre of 29 August 1997, 100-400 deaths
 Sidi-Hamed massacre of 11 January 1998, 120-400 deaths

Wilaya of Chlef
 Alleged Tenes massacre of 4 May 1994, 173 deaths (not independently verified)
 Tadjena massacre of 8 December 1998, 81 deaths

Wilaya of Médéa
 Berrouaghia prison massacre of 14 November 1994, 8-200 deaths
 Thalit massacre of 3–4 April 1997, 52 deaths
 Omaria massacre of 23 April 1997, 43 deaths
 Chouardia massacre of 27 April 1998, over 40 deaths
 Guelb El-Kebir massacre, 19 September 1997, 53 deaths

Wilaya of M'Sila
 Dairat Labguer massacre of 16 June 1997, 50 deaths

Wilaya of Oran
 Sidi Daoud massacre of 12 October 1997, 43-50 deaths

Wilaya of Relizane
 Wilaya of Relizane massacres,  of 30 December 1997, 78-412
 Khrouba massacre, 176 deaths
 Sahnoun massacre, 113 deaths
 El-Abadel massacre, 73 deaths
 Ouled-Tayeb massacre, 50 deaths
 Wilaya of Relizane massacres of 4 January 1998, ~1000 deaths
 Remka massacre, 117 deaths

Wilaya of Saïda
 Baloul massacre of 2 September 1998, 40-60 deaths

Wilayas of Tiaret and Tissemsilt
 Sid El-Antri massacre of 23–24 December 1997, 53-117 deaths

Other wilayas
 Oued Bouaicha massacre of 26 March 1998, 52 deaths, W. of Djelfa
 Beni Ounif massacre of 15 August 1999, 29 people

See also
Algerian Civil War
Timeline of the Algerian Civil War
Human rights in Algeria
List of massacres in Algeria
Terrorist bombings in Algeria

References

Sources
 "An Anatomy of the Massacres", Ait-Larbi, Ait-Belkacem, Belaid, Nait-Redjam, and Soltani, in An Inquiry into the Algerian Massacres, ed. Bedjaoui, Aroua, and Ait-Larbi, Hoggar: Geneva 1999.

External links
 Chronologie des massacres en Algerie
 Algeria in the grip of terror - an effort to understand the background of the massacres

 
Massacres of the 1990s
Algerian Civil War
Algerian War